Leland Purvis is a comic book writer and artist, best known for his black and white series Vóx and Pubo.

Awards
Purvis was nominated for the 2004 Ignatz Award for Promising New Talent for his work on Suspended in Language. He was also the recipient of a 2000 Xeric Foundation grant to support the creation of Vóx.

Bibliography

As writer and artist
 Vóx #1-4 (of 4), Pack Rabbit Press, 2000-2003
 collected in Vox : collected works, 1999-2003, Absence of Ink Comics, 2004
 Pubo #1-3 (of 3), Dark Horse Comics, 2002-2003
 collected in Pubo, Dark Horse Comics, 2003
 Vulcan & Vishnu, a web-comic

As primary artist
 Suspended in language : Niels Bohr's life, discoveries, and the century he shaped (writer: Jim Ottaviani), G. T. Labs, 2004
 Shellgame (story, photography, and design by Marc Calvary; art by Leland Purvis), The Carbon Based Mistake
 Resistance: Book One, (writer: Carla Jablonski), First Second Books (2010)
 The Imitation Game (writer: Jim Ottaviani), Tor.com, 2014

As contributor
 The Monon Street Power Collective 1, (Various artists and writers), Welsh El Dorado Press, 2004
 24seven, (various artists and writers), Image Comics, 2006 
 "The First Move" (writer: Elizabeth Genco) in Smut Peddler #3, Saucy Goose Press, 2006

Footnotes

References
 Rappaport, Adrienne. "Declaration of Independents: Sotto Vox: Leland Purvis (Vox)" [interview] Sequential Tart. Feb 2004. 
 Carlson, Johanna Draper. "Suspended in Language" [review]. Comics Worth Reading. March 18, 2006.
 McElhatton, Greg. "Vox" [review]. iComics.com. March 19, 2001.
 "Leland Purvis on Pubo #1" [interview]. originally on DarkHorse.com, reprinted on LelandPurvis.com. October 1, 2002.

External links
 Streetfables — "a venue for the self-published comics, zines and chapbooks of Leland Purvis and Elizabeth Genco".
 

Alternative cartoonists
American comics artists
American comics writers
Living people
Year of birth missing (living people)